Alhaji Mohamed Kemoh Fadika (born in Bo, Sierra Leone) is a Sierra Leonean diplomat and a former Sierra Leone ambassador to Iran. He was appointed to the position by the country's president Ernest Bai Koroma on June 21, 2008. Fadika had served as Sierra Leone's ambassador to Egypt from 1981 to 1983, he also served as Sierra Leone deputy High Commissioner to Nigeria from 1977 to 1981. Fadika was born in Sierra Leone to Muslim parents from the Mandinka ethnic group.

References

External links
 Kemoh Fadika, Wusu Munu approved as Ambassadors to Iran and Saudi Arabia cocrioko.net, 21 June 2008

Year of birth missing (living people)
Living people
Sierra Leonean diplomats
Ambassadors of Sierra Leone to Iran
Ambassadors of Sierra Leone to Egypt
All People's Congress politicians
Sierra Leonean Mandingo people
People from Bo, Sierra Leone
Njala University alumni
Sierra Leonean Muslims